Sons of Azrael is an American death metal band from Buffalo, New York, that formed in 2004.

History
Their first album, The Conjuration of Vengeance, was released in August 2007.

Members
Guitarist Tony Lorenzo was shot and paralysed in October 2011. He died in March 2017, aged 30.

In October 2012 singer Joe Siracuse died, aged 29.

Discography
 2-Song Demo (2004)
 Kill Yourself (Demo, 2004)
 A Bullet, That Blew The Beauty Off Your Face (Demo, 2005)
 Ashes to Ashes (Demo, 2006)
 The Conjuration of Vengeance (CD, Ironclad/Metal Blade, 2007)
 Scouting the Boneyard (2010)

References

External links

Musical groups established in 2004
Death metal musical groups from New York (state)
Metal Blade Records artists